Viy may refer to:

Вий or "Viy" (story), Russian horror novella by Nikolai Gogol published 1835
Numerous derivative works, among those listed at  Viy (story)#Film adaptations being:
Viy (1909 film), a 1909 Russian lost film
Viy (1967 film), based on the Nikolai Gogol story
Viy (2014 film), a dark fantasy film inspired by Gogol story
Viy 2: Journey to China, a sequel to the 2014 film
Viy (band), a Ukrainian band
Viy, Azerbaijan, a village in Lankaran Rayon